Christian Bergelin (15 April 1945 – 26 March 2008) was a French politician. He was Secretary of State for Sport and Youth in the Government of Jacques Chirac (1986–1988).

He was deputy of Haute-Saône at the National Assembly of France and had been president of this department for more than 10 years.

References

1945 births
2008 deaths
Senators of Haute-Saône